Herbert Max "Whitey" Wolter (August 22, 1899 - 21 August 1947) was an American football player in the National Football League for the Kenosha Maroons in 1924.

Early life
Wolter was born in Milwaukee, Wisconsin, and played football at North Side High School in 1916 and 1917. He attended the Milwaukee State Teachers College where he played at the college level.

Professional career
After college, Wolter played for local independent teams. In 1924, he played one season for the Kenosha Maroons as tailback.

Personal
Wolter and his wife Alice had two daughters, Carla and Marjorie. Wolter died at the age of 48 in Cedarburg, Wisconsin.

References

External links
 Death of Whitey Wolter Recalls His Days as Great Athlete Here

1899 births
1947 deaths
Players of American football from Milwaukee
American football running backs
Kenosha Maroons players
University of Wisconsin–Milwaukee alumni